Anandharamakrishnan Chinnaswamy, commonly referred as Anandharamakrishnan is an Indian scientist and academician, having expertise in Chemical Engineering and Food processing. He is working as Director of National Institute of Interdisciplinary Science and Technology, (NIIST) Trivandrum. Earlier, he served as Director of National Institute of Food Technology, Entrepreneurship and Management, Thanjavur (NIFTEM-T) (Formerly known as Indian Institute of Food Processing Technology (IIFPT), Thanjavur, Tamil Nadu during the period April 2016 – 2022 and as Senior Principal Scientist at the CSIR - Central Food Technological Research Institute (CFTRI), Mysuru.

Education and professional career
Anandharamakrishnan completed his bachelor's degree (BTech) in Chemical Engineering (1990–94) and master's degree (MTech) 1994-1996 batch from Alagappa College of Technology, Anna University, India. He got scholarship under Commonwealth Scholarship programme of United Kingdom for pursuing PhD in Chemical Engineering at Loughborough University, United Kingdom, for his work on 'Experimental and Computational Fluid Dynamics Studies on Sprayfreeze-drying and Spray-drying of Proteins'. He started his career as Scientist at Central Food Technological Research Institute (CFTRI), Mysuru from the year 1999 and became principal scientist in the year 2010. He then joined as Director, Indian Institute of Food Processing Technology, Thanjavur in the year 2016. During his tenure as Director, IIFPT has attained Institute of National Importance status by The National Institutes of Food Technology, Entrepreneurship and Management (NIFTEM) Act 2021 and subsequently IIFPT is renamed as National Institute of Food Technology, Entrepreneurship and Management (NIFTEM)Thanjavur. From November 2022, he is serving as Director of National Institute for Interdisciplinary Science and Technology (NIIST), Trivandrum. His research endeavors are well documented in peer reviewed reputed international scientific journals. He has two International patents, seven Indian patents and authored six books. He is ranked among the top 2 percentile of the scientist working in food science and technology as per the career long data updated to end-of-2020 published by Elsevier BV and Stanford University

Legacy
Anandharamakrishnan is known for his pioneering research works in the field of Food processing with special focus on Food Engineering, Food nanotechnology, Engineered human digestive systems and Food 3D printing. His works also spanned across inter-disciplinary fields such as food industry waste utilisation, food processing equipment design, novel food matrix development for drug delivery and functional foods.

Engineered human stomach and small intestinal system
Anandharamakrishnan has developed engineered human stomach and small intestine dynamic digestive system called ARK® to study the digestion and absorption behaviour of the foods in human stomach. This ARK® system is designed to study the particle breakdown and digestive pattern of the cooked white rice in our alimentary canal. This ARK® system simulates the physiological conditions of small intestine and records the level of absorption of micro nutrients and nanoformulated bioactive compounds present in foods. This information is useful in the development of functional food and supplements. Recently, this ARK® system has been used to predict the glycemic response curve similar to that of in-vivo human blood glucose level.

3D food printing
Anandharamakrishnan's research contributions are transforming food processing sector through multidimensional (3D / 4D) food printing. He has custom built in-house designed 3D food printer which could print wide range of food materials from semi-solid paste to hydrogels. He is credited with India's first publication on 3D and 4D food printing. Some of the novel printed food products are:  Designer 3D printed egg, Customized and personalized delivery of curcumin through spontaneous color transformation of sago constructs using 4D food printing technology, Fiber and protein enriched personalized 3D printed snack from indigenous millets, pulses, mushroom. His researches have been focused on efficient utilization of milling fractions of rice using 3D printing, 3D printed functional cookies from valorization of food waste, towards development of sustainable foods of future. Also to promote health through 3D printed probiotic snack to improve the gut health, 3D printed chicken nuggets – a customized snack with enrichment of dietary fiber to combat lifestyle disorders. Customized 3D printed biodegradable food package from agricultural biomass, suitable alternative for petroleum-based food packing materials is also accounted to his reach accomplishments.

Awards and honours
 Tata Innovation Fellowship (DBT, Govt. of India) 2019-20
 NASI Reliance Industries Platinum Jubilee Award (2018)
 National Design Award in Environmental Engineering (2019) |
 ICAR-Rafi Ahmed Kidwai Award for Outstanding Research in Agricultural Sciences- 2019|
 All India Food Processors Association (AIFPA) Special Platinum Jubilee Award (2018)
 Alkyl Amines Padma Bhushan Prof. B.D. Tilak CHEMCON Distinguished Speaker Award (2016)
 Fellow of National Academy of Sciences (NASc) (2019)|
 Fellow of National Academy of Agricultural Sciences (NAAS) (2019)| 
 Fellow of Association of Food Scientists and Technologists (India) AFSTi (2017) 
 Fellow of Royal Society of Chemistry (RSC) (2016)
 Ranked as Top 2 percentile of the scientist working in Food Science by Elsevier BV and Stanford University

Books
 Anandharamakrishnan. C, Padma Ishwarya.S, Essentials and Applications of Food Engineering, CRC Press, 2019 
 Anandharamakrishnan.C, Parthasarathi.S, Food Nanotechnology Principles and Applications, CRC Press, 2019
 Anandharamakrishnan. C, (Ed), Handbook of Drying for Dairy Products, John Wiley, 2017
 Anandharamakrishnan. C, Padma Ishwarya. S, Spray Drying Techniques for Food Ingredient Encapsulation, John Wiley, 2015
 Anandharamakrishnan. C, Techniques for Nanoencapsulation of Food Ingredients, Springer, 2014
 Anandharamakrishnan. C, Computational Fluid Dynamics Applications in Food Processing, Springer, 2013

References

Living people
Anna University alumni
Alumni of Loughborough University
20th-century Indian scientists
21st-century Indian scientists
Fellows of the Royal Society of Chemistry
Year of birth missing (living people)